The R705 road is a regional road in Ireland which runs north-south from the R448 at Leighlinbridge in County Carlow and through Muine Bheag before crossing into County Kilkenny. 
It continues to Graiguenamanagh, passes Brandon Hill (516m) and continues south along the western side of the valley of the River Barrow
until it terminates at a junction with the R700.

See also
Roads in Ireland
National primary road
National secondary road

References
Roads Act 1993 (Classification of Regional Roads) Order 2006 – Department of Transport

Regional roads in the Republic of Ireland
Roads in County Kilkenny
Roads in County Carlow